The Rural Municipality of Riverside No. 168 is a rural municipality (RM) in the Canadian province of Saskatchewan within Census Division No. 8 and  Division No. 3.

History 
The RM of Riverside No. 168 incorporated as a rural municipality on January 1, 1913.

Historical properties
There is one historical building located within the RM.

St. John's Norwegian Lutheran Church - (Also called St. John's Lutheran Church and Cemetery) the building was erected in 1919 by Norwegian pioneers to the area. The site is located 15 km south of Cabri

Geography 
The north boundary of the RM is one of the arms of Lake Diefenbaker.

Communities and localities 
The following urban municipalities are surrounded by the RM.

Towns
Cabri

Villages
Success

The following unincorporated communities are within the RM.

Localities
Battrum

Demographics 

Government 
The RM of Riverside No. 168 is governed by an elected municipal council and an appointed administrator that meets on the second Tuesday of every month. The reeve of the RM is Richard Bye while its administrator is Brandi Prentice. The RM's office is located in Pennant.

Cabri Regional Park 
Cabri Regional Park is a regional park on the southern shore of Lake Diefenbaker that was created in 1976. The park has a campground, beach access, a marina, 3-hole disk golf, boat launch, picnic area, and hiking trails. The campground has over 100 sites, potable water, showers / washrooms, camp kitchen, and a sewer dumping station.

Transportation 
 Saskatchewan Highway 32
 Saskatchewan Highway 332
 Saskatchewan Highway 738

See also 
List of rural municipalities in Saskatchewan

References 

Riverside No. 168, Saskatchewan
Riverside